Ust-Kurashim is a rural locality (a village) in Platoshinskoye Rural Settlement, Permsky District, Perm Krai, Russia. The population was 21 as of 2010. There are 5 streets.

Geography 
Ust-Kurashim is located 58 km south of Perm (the district's administrative centre) by road. Platoshino is the nearest rural locality.

References 

Rural localities in Permsky District